Abebe Fekadu (born 20 April 1970) is an Ethiopian Australian powerlifter. He competed at the 2008 Summer Paralympics, where he finished tenth. He was selected to represent Australia at the 2012 Summer Paralympics in powerlifting.  He did not medal at the 2012 Games.

Personal
Nicknamed Abba, Fekadu was born on 20 April 1970 in Mekelle, Ethiopia. The Ethiopian junta executed his father around 1977, when Fekadu was about eight years old.  In response to that, he joined the secret anti-government, pro-democracy movement in Ethiopia. The government did not look kindly on his activities.  One day in 1997 near Gonder, while trying to avoid an arrest, he was involved in a police chase that resulted in a serious car accident that left him a paraplegic.  He was initially treated by a local medicine man.  He left Ethiopia for Italy in order to receive treatment, choosing Italy because his brother was living there.  He moved to Australia within two years of moving to Italy because his sister was living in the country.  He was initially a refugee and detained by the Australian government.

In 2007, Fekadu became an Australian citizen. He resides in Queensland as of 2012.

Powerlifting
Fekadu is a powerlifter. He started powerlifting in 2002 after meeting Ramon Epstein while at a gym in Brisbane.

In 2004, Fekadu was the Australian national champion in the men's 56 kilograms event.  He continued to hold the title in 2005, 2006 and 2007. In 2007, he competed in the Asian Paralympics Committee Powerlifting Cup in Kuala Lumpur, where he earned a silver medal.  That year, he also represented Australia at the Arafura Games, where he earned a gold medal while lifting . He competed in the 2008 Summer Paralympics in the men's 56 kilograms event, where he finished tenth overall.  Going into the Paralympics, his personal best lift was 160 kilograms.  Members of the Ethiopian Paralympic team met him and shook his hand at the Paralympics dining hall during the 2008 Games.

Fekadu was selected to represent Australia at the 2012 Summer Paralympics in powerlifting in the Under 56 kg event but did not medal.

References

External links 
 
 

1970 births
Living people
Paralympic powerlifters of Australia
Powerlifters at the 2008 Summer Paralympics
Powerlifters at the 2012 Summer Paralympics
Commonwealth Games competitors for Australia
Powerlifters at the 2014 Commonwealth Games
Sportspeople from Brisbane
Australian people of Ethiopian descent